The 1947 Kentucky Derby was the 73rd running of the Kentucky Derby. The race took place on May 3, 1947, on a track rated slow.

Full results

 Winning breeder: Arthur B. Hancock & Margaret Good Van Clief (KY)

References

1947
Kentucky Derby
Derby
Kentucky Derby